Alihan Samedov (born 27 April 1964) is an Azerbaijani musician known for playing wind instruments and Azerbaijan folk instruments.

Alihan Samedov was born in Sumgait, Azerbaijan SSR in 1964. Descending from a musician family, he completed his first and secondary education between the years 1971 and 1979. He received his music education at the Samad Vurghun and Nariman Narimanov music school. In 1986 he entered the applied teaching school of Azerbaijan State Pedagogy University and graduated from the same in 1990. He is the master player of wind instruments (balaban, clarinet, tutek, zurna, oboe, saxophone). He is a chess master. He is currently teaching chess at Erenkoy First School and he is the Music Directors of Kadikoy Folklore Education Centre. Folk Dances Department of Eyuboglu Educational Institutions. Istanbul Caucasus Dance Company as well as the person in charge of Azerbaijani Music at Samanyolu TV's (STV) Music and Entertainment Programs.  In his albums Samedov presents the instrument the balaban with his own interpretation. The album, titled Balaban, is released by Mega Music.

Artistic activities
1988 Germany - Azerbaijan Cultural Festival
1990 Antalya - Golden Orange Festival
1991 France - National Lion Festival
1994 France - Amneville Folk Dances Festival
1994 Ankara - ITU TMDK Concerts
1995 Gaziantep - G.Antep Conservatory Festivities
1995 Istanbul - ITU TMDK Concerts
1996 Poland - Zakopane Folk Dances Festival
1997 Spain CIUDAD Folk Dances Festival
1998 Istanbul - Istanbul Culture Festival
1998 Poland - Olsztyn Folk Dances Festival
1999 Şırnak - OHAL Region Culture Festival
2000 Kırıkkale - 3rd Turkish World Festival
2001 Spain - CIUDAD Folk Dances Festival
2001 Singapore - Turkish week

Awards
1993 Istanbul / Folk Dances -The Best Music
1996 Poland - The Best Music & The Best Musician
1997 The "Milliyet" Newspaper Special Awards

References

External links
 Alihan Samedov website

Living people
1964 births
Turkish people of Azerbaijani descent
Azerbaijani folk musicians
Dudukahars
Azerbaijani emigrants to Turkey
Soviet Azerbaijani people
People from Sumgait
Culture in Sumgait